Jean-Charles Tacchella (born 23 September 1925) is a French screenwriter  and film director. He was nominated for an Academy Award for Best Original Screenplay for his film Cousin Cousine (1975), which was also nominated for the Academy Award for Best Foreign Language Film and which was later (1989) remade in a US version starring Ted Danson and titled Cousins.

Early career
Jean-Charles Tacchella studied in Marseilles and, just after the Liberation, left for Paris with the aim of becoming a film director. He joined L'écran Français when he was nineteen where he worked with Renoir, Becker and Grémillon. While with the magazine, he wrote about filmmakers, actors, films and met André Bazin, Nino Frank, Roger Leenhardt, Roger Thérond and Alexandre Astruc. He became friends with Erich Von Stroheim, Anna Magnani, Vittorio de Sica and created the monthly “Ciné Digest” with Henri Colpi. In 1948, Tacchella, along with Bazin, Jacques Doniol-Valcroze, Astruc, Claude Mauriac, René Clément and Pierre Kast, established Objectif 49, an avant-garde film club whose president was Jean Cocteau. Objectif 49 became the birthplace of the New Wave.

Film director
Jean-Charles Tacchella has since directed eleven features, many of which have had successful international careers and been awarded prestigious prizes. They include Voyage to Grand Tartarie (1974), Cousin cousine (1975, nominated for the Oscars Césars, Silver Shell for Best Director at the 1976 San Sebastian International Film Festival), Le Pays bleu (1977), It's a Long Time I've Loved You (1979, Jury Prize at the Montreal Film Festival), Croque la vie (1981), Staircase C (1985, Prix de l'Académie française, Grand Prix at the Uppsala Film Festival), Travelling avant (1987, Best Male Newcomer for Thierry Frémont – Golden Tulip for Best Director at the Istanbul Film Festival), Gallant Ladies (Best Director, Digne Film Festival 1990), The Man of My Life (1992), Seven Sundays (1995).

Tacchella is described as being "a smooth technician, Tacchella's camera work is fluid and precise". And his movie Traveling avant (1987), roughly equivalent to the American film term "Tracking Shot", is described as "a semi-autobiographical paean to his youth as a cinema fanatic and cine-club enthusiast in post-war Paris".

Cinémathèque
Tacchella was President of the Cinémathèque Française from 2000–2003.

Selected filmography

References

External links

1925 births
Living people
French male screenwriters
French screenwriters
French film directors